Eddy Vilard (born Manuel Eduardo Villasana Ruiz on November 2, 1988, in Cancún, Quintana Roo, Mexico) is a Mexican actor and model.

Biography 
Before joining the cast of Rebelde, Eddy Vilard was part of the Necaxa and Cruz Azul soccer teams; he was going to be drafted to Argentina to play pro-soccer because of his skills, but he hit a nerve while playing and was unable to go.
He appeared in Belinda's music video for her hit single "Ángel".

Filmography

Film

Television

Awards and  nominations

TVyNovelas Awards

References

External links
 

1988 births
Living people
Mexican male film actors
Mexican male telenovela actors
Male actors from Quintana Roo
People from Cancún
21st-century Mexican male actors